Haft Jush (also Romanized as  Haft Jūsh and Haft Joosh) is a village in Angali Rural District, in the Central District of Bushehr County, Bushehr Province, Iran. At the 2006 census, its population was 25, in 9 families.

References 

Populated places in Bushehr County